The Iowa Army National Guard is a state agency of the State of Iowa, with significant funding from the Federal Government of the United States; and a reserve component of the United States Army. It has dual Federal and State missions. It is empowered to function under control of the Governor, as a State asset in times of emergency or natural disaster, or if needed to carry out limited actions during non-emergency situations to include full scale Enforcement of martial law, when local law enforcement officials can no longer maintain civil control. The National Guard may also be called into federal service in response to a call by the President or Congress.

Iowa National Guard units are trained and equipped as part of the United States National Guard. The same enlisted ranks, officer ranks and insignia are used. National Guardsmen are eligible to receive all United States military awards. The Iowa National Guard also bestows a number of state awards for local services rendered in or to the state of Iowa.

Major Subordinate Commands
Joint Forces Headquarters
734th Regional Support Command
67th Troop Command
671st Troop Command
2d Brigade Combat Team, 34th Infantry Division

Duties
National Guard units can be mobilized at any time by presidential order to supplement regular armed forces, and upon declaration of a state of emergency by the governor of the state in which they serve. Unlike Army Reserve members, National Guard members cannot be mobilized individually (except through voluntary transfers and Temporary Duty Assignments TDY), but only as part of their respective units. However, there has been a significant number of individual activations to support military operations. The legality of this policy is a major issue within the National Guard.

Active Duty Callups
For much of the final decades of the twentieth century, National Guard personnel typically served "One weekend a month, two weeks a year", with a portion working for the Guard in a full-time capacity. The current forces formation plans of the US Army call for the typical National Guard unit (or National Guardsman) to serve one year of active duty for every three years of service. More specifically, current Department of Defense policy is that no Guardsman will be involuntarily activated for a total of more than 24 months (cumulative) in one six-year enlistment period (this policy is due to change 1 August 2007, the new policy states that soldiers will be given 24 months between deployments of no more than 24 months, individual states have differing policies).

History
The Iowa Army National Guard was originally formed in 1838. The Militia Act of 1903 organized the various state militias into the present National Guard system.

The 133d Infantry Regiment, formerly the 2nd Iowa Volunteer Infantry, served as part of the 67th Infantry Brigade, 34th Division, during World War I. The 67th Infantry Brigade was disbanded in February 1919, but formed again in 1921, still as part of the 34th Division. From 1921 to 1942, it was part of the Guard in Iowa, comprising the 168th Infantry Regiment. Approximately 50 Iowa ARNG soldiers deployed to Iraq with the Combat Aviation Brigade, 36th Infantry Division in September 2006.

Units of the Iowa Army National Guard formed since 1917 include:
  113th Armor Regiment 
  133d Infantry Regiment – formerly the 2nd Iowa Volunteer Infantry, created and assigned to the 34th Division on 1 October 1917
 168th Infantry Regiment
  185th Field Artillery Regiment
  194th Field Artillery Regiment
 185th Support Battalion
 334th Support Battalion
 1034th Support Battalion
 224th Engineer Battalion
 734th Maintenance Battalion
 109th Aviation Regiment

Notable members
 Rudolph Martin Anderson
 Joni Ernst

See also
Iowa State Guard

References

External links
 
Iowa Army National Guard. Retrieved 23 June 2016
GlobalSecurity.org Iowa Army National Guard. Retrieved 28 November 2006
Unit Designations in the Army Modular Force. Retrieved 23 November 2006*Bibliography of Iowa Army National Guard History compiled by the United States Army Center of Military History
Camp Cody – Iowa National Guard World War I

 
United States Army National Guard by state
Military in Iowa